Big Ridge is an unincorporated community in New Madrid County, in the U.S. state of Missouri.

The community has a historic church  and once had a schoolhouse. A relatively tall ridge near the site accounts for the name.

References

Unincorporated communities in New Madrid County, Missouri
Unincorporated communities in Missouri